Richard Thomas Aude (born July 13, 1971 in Van Nuys, California), is an American former professional baseball player who played first base in  and from  to  for the Pittsburgh Pirates of the Major League Baseball (MLB). He is the brother of acclaimed producer, house DJ and remixer Dave Audé.

A viral video of Aude pimping his walk-off home run to end a May 1994 game at Pilot Field between the Buffalo Bisons and Louisville Redbirds was covered by media outlets including Deadspin and MLB.com.

References

External links

1971 births
Living people
American expatriate baseball players in Canada
Atlantic City Surf players
Augusta Pirates players
Baseball players from Los Angeles
Birmingham Barons players
Buffalo Bisons (minor league) players
Calgary Cannons players
Carolina Mudcats players
Gulf Coast Expos players
Gulf Coast Pirates players
Major League Baseball first basemen
People from Van Nuys, Los Angeles
Pittsburgh Pirates players
Salem Buccaneers players
Syracuse SkyChiefs players
Chatsworth High School alumni